Suyruqucha (Quechua suyru a very long dress tracked after when worn, qucha lake, also spelled Suirococha) is a mountain in the Andes of Peru which reaches a height of approximately . It is located in the Junín Region, Jauja Province, Apata District. It lies south of Marayrasu.

References 

Mountains of Peru
Mountains of Junín Region